Cesare Bovo  (born 14 January 1983) is an Italian retired professional footballer who played as a centre back.

Club career

Early career
Bovo grew up playing in the A.S. Roma youth system,  while in the 2001–02 season he only played a game in the Coppa Italia: Brescia–Roma (3–0) on 8 January 2002.

In 2002, he was sold in co-ownership to Lecce (swapped with Mauro Rizzo), where he remained for two years and made his debut in Serie A on 5 October 2003 in Lecce–Brescia (1–4). On 2 May 2, 2004 he scored in a 2–1 home win against Internazionale, contributing to saving Lecce from relegation. With 2 goals in the league, he achieved his personal record of goals in a season. In June 2004, he was redeemed by Roma for €10,000, while Rizzo returned to Lecce for €40,000.

On 31 July 2004 he moved to Parma in temporary deal for €100,000, as part of the signing of defender Matteo Ferrari,  Palermo bought half of his contract on 31 August 2004 for €1.5 million (in pure player exchange: Francesco Milano and Paolo Comi) Even this season he scored 2 goals in the league, equaling his record. The transfer of Bovo, Gianluca Curci, Simone Pepe and Valerio Virga were also accused uneconomical, and were compensation to Maurizio Zamparini for the acquirement of Palermo from Franco Sensi., which Roma denied, despite the sales of 4 players only received  one thousand and five hundred euro cash plus half of the registration rights of two reserve players Comi and Milano. Roma did have a net short term debt to Palermo of €1.75 million on 30 June 2004 due to the transfer of Brienza–Bombardini, which paid by Roma in cash but counter-weighted on 30 June 2006 due to the full purchase of Bovo by Palermo .

On 1 July 2005 Bovo returned his hometown club, Roma in temporary deal for €750,000 (via the transfer of Massimo Bonanni to Palermo). His presence on the field was often limited by competition from Cristian Chivu, Philippe Mexès and Samuel Kuffour, such that the coach Luciano Spalletti often deployed him as a full-back.

 the transfer of the defender in rosanero materialised in June 2006 for €2.05 million; while Virga returned to Roma for €50,000. Roma made around €200,000 less to the bid of Palermo.

In the final day of the transfer market of January 2007, he moved to Torino on a temporary basis. He played his first match for Torino on 24 February 2007 in Serie A against Chievo.

After the end of the loan he returned to Palermo, however, shortly after he was bought by Genoa, led by Gian Piero Gasperini, on 10 July 2007 in co-ownership bid for €2.85 million.

Return to Palermo

On 19 June 2008 he was redeemed from Palermo for €4.5 million cash plus the transfer of Giuseppe Biava.

He made his debut with Palermo in the second game of the third round of Coppa Italia against Ravenna (1–2), while his first goal for Palermo came in the third day of the championship against Genoa, with a great shot from outside the box. Along with Simon Kjær and Andrea Raggi, his task was to replace the vacancies left by departures of Andrea Barzagli, Cristian Zaccardo and Leandro Rinaudo. He finished the season with only 28 appearances due to the number of cards received. He was Palermo's vice-captain along with Fabrizio Miccoli.

In the 2009–10 season, one of the best in his career, he marked his first goal 25 October 2009 in a home victory against the Udinese, on the ninth day of the season, with a deflected volley from the edge of the area. At the end of the season he suffered from metatarsalgia which required operation on 12 April 2010. Back on 24 April, he scored the first goal in a 3–1 win against A.C. Milan. He closed the season with a total of 29 appearances in the league (and 2 goals, a record equaled again) plus 3 appearances in Coppa Italia.

In the 2010–11 season, on 11 December 2010, he wore the captain's armband for the first time at home against Parma. On 22 January 2011, in Palermo–Brescia (1–0) of the 21st round, he scored the winning goal from a free kick in the 86th minute, equaling once again the personal record of goals scored in a season.

On 10 April 2011, in Palermo–Cesena (2–2), he made his 100th appearance with the shirt of Palermo; 86 in the league, 7 in Coppa Italia and 7 in European competition.

On 23 April, in a home game against Napoli, played on the 34th day, and won 2–1, he scored his third league goal with a penalty kick, thus overcoming his personal scoring record.

On 10 May, in the second leg of the Coppa Italia against Milan, he scored the 2–0 on a penalty kick, that ended 2–1. In the final, lost 3–1 to Inter, Bovo was disqualified due to his expulsion after the prior goal. He closed the season with 43 appearances and 5 goals between the league, Coppa Italia and Europa League.

In the 2011–12 season, after playing the two matches of the third qualifying round of the Europa League against the Swiss FC Thun, he left the rosaneri after a total of 108 appearances and 8 goals.

Return to Genoa
On 23 August 2011 he returned to Genoa in a loan move for €200,000 with an option to make the move permanent for €1.3 million.

He made his debut in Genoa–Atalanta (2–2) on the second day of the championship held on 11 September 2011. He was injured early in the season, missing much of it.

On 13 January 2012 Genoa acquired full ownership of the player for pre-agreed €1.3M and sold half of the registration rights of goalkeeper Emiliano Viviano to Palermo for €5M.

He returned to the field 7 April 2012, the 31st round, replacing Emiliano Moretti in Novara–Genoa (1–1). In a match against Siena he sprained his right knee, tearing his outer meniscus, which prematurely closed his season with 8 appearances.

On 18 November 2012, he scored an own goal during the Derby della Lanterna against Sampdoria ending 3–1 in favor of Sampdoria.

Return to Torino
On 9 July 2013 he moved back to Torino on a free transfer, six years after his previous experience in Turin. During the 2013–14 season, he played in 20 league games for Torino. On 2 June 2014 he renewed his contract until 2016.

He scored his first goal of the 2015–16 season on 31 October 2015, during the derby, scoring the momentary equaliser for Torino in a 2–1 loss to Juventus. On 22 November he scored the winning goal against Atalanta, 1–0, in Bergamo. Three days later he renewed his contract with the club until 2017.

Pescara

On 4 January 2017 he was sold to Pescara. He spent two seasons in Abruzzo.

Return to Lecce 
On 12 September 2018 he made his return to Lecce.

International career
Bovo was part of the Italy under-21 team, of which he was captain, that won the 2004 UEFA European Under-21 Football Championship. He scored the momentary 2–0 in the 81st minute during the final against Serbia. The match ended 3–0 for the Azzurri.

He also represented Italy at the 2004 Summer Olympics football tournament. During the quarterfinals, he scored the winning goal during extra time against Mali. He won a bronze medal.

In 2006, he disputed his second European Under-21 tournament, eliminated during the first round.

On 28 August 2010 he was called up to the senior national team by the new coach Cesare Prandelli, for matches against Estonia and Faroe Islands, during the qualifications for the UEFA Euro 2012 without ever taking to the field.

Style of play
A central defender, Bovo was originally a left-back, but equally capable of playing in a back-line of 3 or 4 defenders. Bovo is noted for his ball control and is a free-kick specialist, possessing a strong shot from range.

Coaching career
After retirement, Bovo joined Fabio Liverani's coaching staff at Lecce as a technical collaborator for the 2019–20 Serie A season. He successively followed Liverani at Parma for the 2020–21 Serie A season. On 8 June 2022, he signed for Cagliari as part of Fabio Liverani's staff.

Career statistics

Club

Honours

Club
Roma
Serie A: 2000–01

International
UEFA European Under-21 Championship: Germany 2004
Olympic bronze: Athens 2004

Orders
 5th Class / Knight: Cavaliere Ordine al Merito della Repubblica Italiana: 2004

References

External links

 Profile at Torino's official club website 
 International Caps at FIGC.com 

1983 births
Footballers from Rome
Living people
Italian footballers
A.S. Roma players
Parma Calcio 1913 players
Torino F.C. players
Genoa C.F.C. players
Palermo F.C. players
U.S. Lecce players
Delfino Pescara 1936 players
Olympic footballers of Italy
Olympic bronze medalists for Italy
Footballers at the 2004 Summer Olympics
Association football defenders
Serie A players
Serie B players
Italy under-21 international footballers
Italy youth international footballers
Olympic medalists in football
Medalists at the 2004 Summer Olympics
Knights of the Order of Merit of the Italian Republic